Katherine Grant may refer to:

Katherine Grant (actress) (1904–1937), American actress
Katherine Grant, 12th Countess of Dysart (1918–2011), Scottish politician
Katherine Whyte Grant (1845–1928), Scottish writer

See also
Kathryn Grant (disambiguation), a disambiguation page for people named "Kathryn Grant"